Bill Jones (1924-1995) was a footballer who played as a forward in the Football League for Manchester City and Chester.

He subsequently played non-league football, playing for Witton Albion before joining Mossley in the 1955–56 season where he made 15 appearances scoring two goals.

References

Chester City F.C. players
Manchester City F.C. players
Association football forwards
English Football League players
Telford United F.C. players
1924 births
1995 deaths
English footballers
Mossley A.F.C. players
Witton Albion F.C. players